General Solly Zacharia Shoke,  (born 15 August 1956) is a South African military commander. He joined uMkhonto we Sizwe (MK), the military wing of the African National Congress, in the 1970s, and served as a field commander fighting against the South African government in the 1980s. He transferred to the South African National Defence Force (SANDF) when MK was incorporated into it in 1994, and  served as Chief of the South African National Defence Force 2011 to 30 May 2021.

Military career
Shoke received his education at Orlando High School, Orlando Township, in Johannesburg. Other academic qualifications include a Diploma in Human Resources Management from Damelin, a Certificate in Defence Management from the University of the Witwatersrand and a Certificate in Personnel Management from IPM. Shoke joined Umkhonto we Sizwe, the military wing of the African National Congress (ANC), in the 1970s. In the 1980s he served as field commander during the liberation struggle against the South African government. He obtained his military training in Angola and completed the Brigade Commanders Course in the USSR. He became part of the underground leadership of Operation Vula in 1988. Between 1993 and 1994, Shoke followed an Intermediate Staff Course in Zimbabwe. In 1994 he was appointed as Director Personnel Planning of the South African Army.

In 1998, Shoke commanded the South African Development Community forces during Operation Boleas in Lesotho. He was the Director Personnel Acquisition from January 1999 to October 2000, when he was promoted to the rank of major general as the Chief Director Human Resources Support. He was promoted to Chief of the Army in 2004, and became Chief of the South African National Defence Force in May 2011.

Honours and awards
  Shoke was awarded the Order of Mendi for Bravery for his work in the G5 unit of Umkhonto weSizwe.
 
 
 
 
 
 
 
 
 
 
  Order of Military Merit (Brazil)

References

|-

|-

|-

1956 births
Living people
People from Johannesburg
UMkhonto we Sizwe personnel
Chiefs of the South African Army
South African generals
Order of Mendi for Bravery